Lisnagourneen or Lisnagoorneen is a small townland between Castletownroche and Glanworth in County Cork, Ireland. The Archaeological Survey of Ireland records a possible small ringfort site in the townland. Lisnagoorneen had a population of 47 people as of the 2011 census.

See also
 List of townlands of the barony of Fermoy

References

Townlands of County Cork